Canton–Galva USD 419 is a public unified school district headquartered in Canton, Kansas, United States.  The district includes the communities of Canton, Galva, and nearby rural areas.

Schools
The school district operates three schools:
 Canton-Galva High School in Canton.
 Canton-Galva Middle School in Galva.
 Canton-Galva Elementary School in Canton

See also
 Kansas State Department of Education
 Kansas State High School Activities Association
 List of high schools in Kansas
 List of unified school districts in Kansas

References

External links
 

School districts in Kansas
Education in McPherson County, Kansas